Wilfried Haslauer (born 3 May 1956 in Salzburg) is an Austrian politician (ÖVP) and lawyer. Since 19 June 2013 he has been Governor of the state of Salzburg.

His father Wilfried Haslauer (Senior) was Governor of Salzburg province from 1977 to 1989.
Haslauer is married and has four children.

Honours

Foreign honour
: Knight grand cross of the Order of Merit of the Italian Republic (10February 2020)

References

External links 
Lebenslauf von Landeshauptmann Wilfried Haslauer Biography in English.

1956 births
Living people
Austrian People's Party politicians
Governors of Salzburg (state)